The United States secretary of transportation is the head of the United States Department of Transportation. The secretary serves as the principal advisor to the president of the United States on all matters relating to transportation. The secretary is a statutory member of the Cabinet of the United States, and is fourteenth in the presidential line of succession.

The secretary of transportation oversees the U.S. Department of Transportation, which has over 55,000 employees and thirteen agencies, including the Federal Aviation Administration, the Federal Highway Administration, the Federal Railroad Administration, and the National Highway Traffic Safety Administration. As of January 2021, the secretary receives an annual salary of $221,400.

Pete Buttigieg has served as the secretary of transportation since February 3, 2021. He was confirmed by the United States Senate by a vote of 86–13 on February 2, 2021. Buttigieg is the first openly gay man to hold the position, the first openly gay Cabinet secretary and the youngest person to serve as secretary of transportation.

History
The post was created on October 15, 1966, by the Department of Transportation Act, signed into law by President Lyndon B. Johnson. The department's mission is "to develop and coordinate policies that will provide an efficient and economical national transportation system, with due regard for need, the environment, and the national defense."

The first secretary of transportation was Alan S. Boyd, nominated to the post by Democratic president Lyndon B. Johnson. Ronald Reagan's second secretary of transportation, Elizabeth Dole, was the first female holder, and Mary Peters was the second. Gerald Ford's nominee William Thaddeus Coleman Jr. was the first African American to serve as transportation secretary, and Federico Peña, serving under Bill Clinton, was the first Hispanic to hold the position, subsequently becoming the secretary of energy. Japanese-American Norman Mineta, who had previously been the secretary of commerce, is the longest-serving secretary, holding the post for over five and a half years, and Andrew Card is the shortest-serving secretary, serving only eleven months. Pete Buttigieg is the youngest secretary, taking office at 39 years 15 days old overtaking Neil Goldschmidt as the youngest secretary, taking office at 39 years 3 months old. While Norman Mineta was the oldest, retiring at age 74.  In April 2008, Mary Peters launched the official blog of the secretary of transportation called "The Fast Lane". On January 23, 2009, the 16th secretary Ray LaHood took office, serving under the administration of Democrat Barack Obama; he had previously been a Republican Congressman from Illinois for fourteen years.

Anthony Foxx was the 17th U.S. secretary of transportation from 2013 to 2017, when Barack Obama was the president. Elaine Chao, who served as the secretary of labor under President George W. Bush, was nominated by Donald Trump on November 29, 2016. On January 31, 2017, the Senate confirmed her appointment by a vote of 93–6. On January 7, 2021, Chao announced her resignation following the January 6 United States Capitol attack, effective January 11. On January 11, 2021, acting Deputy Secretary of Transportation Steven G. Bradbury became acting Secretary of Transportation.

List of secretaries of transportation
 Parties
 (8)
 (11)

Status

Line of succession 
The line of succession regarding who would act as Secretary of Transportation in the event of a vacancy or incapacitation is as follows:

Deputy Secretary of Transportation
Under Secretary of Transportation for Policy
General Counsel
Assistant Secretary for Budget and Programs
Assistant Secretary for Transportation Policy
Assistant Secretary for Governmental Affairs 
Assistant Secretary for Aviation and International Affairs
Assistant Secretary for Administration
Administrator of the Federal Highway Administration
Administrator of the Federal Aviation Administration
Administrator of the Federal Motor Carrier Safety Administration
Administrator of the Federal Railroad Administration
Administrator of the Federal Transit Administration
Administrator of the Maritime Administration
Administrator of the Pipeline and Hazardous Materials Safety Administration
Administrator of the National Highway Traffic Safety Administration
Administrator of the Research and Innovative Technology Administration
Administrator of the Saint Lawrence Seaway Development Corporation
Regional Administrator, Southern Region, Federal Aviation Administration
Director, Resource Center, Lakewood, Colorado, Federal Highway Administration
Regional Administrator, Northwest Mountain Region, Federal Aviation Administration

References
General

Specific

External links

The Department of Transportation Act

|-

Transportation
Transportation
 
United States
Secretary
 
1966 establishments in the United States